The men's hammer throw was an event at the 1992 Summer Olympics in Barcelona, Spain. There were 27 participating athletes from 19 nations. The maximum number of athletes per nation had been set at 3 since the 1930 Olympic Congress.

In this Olympics, the Unified Team comprised some of the republics of the former Soviet Union. Andrey Abduvaliyev from Tajikistan, Igor Astapkovich from Belarus, and Igor Nikulin from Russia created a sweep for the Unified Team. It was the fourth sweep in five Games for Soviet/Unified Team athletes; only the boycotted 1984 Games broke the consistent dominance of the Soviets.

The three dominated the competition in the late 80s and early 90s. Astapkovich, the strongest in the season, held the lead after the first round and retook it in the third. Abduvaliyev settled it with his fourth round throw  while both Astapkovich and Nikulin hit their best throws in the final round, they could not match it.

Background

This was the 21st appearance of the event, which has been held at every Summer Olympics except 1896. Six of the 12 finalists from the 1988 Games returned: two-time bronze medalist Jüri Tamm of the Soviet Union (now competing for independent Estonia), fifth-place finisher Heinz Weis of West Germany (now competing for united Germany), sixth-place finisher Tibor Gécsek of Hungary, eighth-place finisher Ivan Tanev of Bulgaria, tenth-place finisher Johann Lindner of Austria, and eleventh-place finisher Tore Gustafsson of Sweden. The Soviet trio that had swept the Olympic medals in both 1980 and 1988, and won the World Championships in 1983 (Sergey Litvinov), 1987 (Litvinov), and 1991 (Yuriy Sedykh), had been replaced by new throwers on the Unified Team, though Tamm continued to compete for Estonia (which was not part of the Unified Team). The new team, led by 1990 European champion Andrey Abduvaliyev, was still dominant and heavily favored.

Bahrain, the People's Republic of China, and Lithuania each made their debut in the event. Some former Soviet Republics competed as the Unified Team; others (Lithuania and Estonia, appearing independently for the first time since 1936) competed separately. The United States appeared for the 20th time, most of any nation, having missed only the boycotted 1980 Games.

Competition format

The competition used the two-round format introduced in 1936, with the qualifying round completely separate from the divided final. In qualifying, each athlete received three attempts; those recording a mark of at least 76.00 metres advanced to the final. If fewer than 12 athletes achieved that distance, the top 12 would advance. The results of the qualifying round were then ignored. Finalists received three throws each, with the top eight competitors receiving an additional three attempts. The best distance among those six throws counted.

Records

Prior to the competition, the existing world and Olympic records were as follows.

No new world or Olympic records were set during the competition.

Schedule

All times are Central European Summer Time (UTC+2)

Results

Qualifying

Final

See also
 1990 Men's European Championships Hammer Throw
1991 Men's World Championship Hammer Throw
1992 Hammer Throw Year Ranking
1993 Men's World Championship Hammer Throw

References

External links
  Official Report
  Results
  hammerthrow.wz

H
Hammer throw at the Olympics
Men's events at the 1992 Summer Olympics